This is a list of trees that grow in Connecticut.

Oaks 
 Quercus alba - Eastern White Oak
 Quercus bicolor - Swamp White Oak
Quercus coccinea - Scarlet Oak
Quercus ilicifolia - Scrub Oak
 Quercus macrocarpa - Bur Oak
Quercus montana - Chestnut Oak
Quercus muehlenbergii - Chinkapin Oak
Quercus palustris - Pin Oak
Quercus prinoides - Dwarf Chinkapin oak
 Quercus prinus - Chestnut Oak
Quercus rubra - Northern Red Oak
Quercus stellata - Iron Oak
Quercus velutina - Eastern Black Oak

Maples 
 Acer rubrum - Red Maple
 Acer saccharum - Sugar Maple
 Acer saccharinum - Silver Maple

Trees
Lists of trees
Trees